The banded dune snail or Morro shoulderband, scientific name Helminthoglypta walkeriana, is a species of air-breathing land snail, a terrestrial pulmonate gastropod mollusc in the family Helminthoglyptidae.

This species is endemic to Morro Bay and the central coast in San Luis Obispo County and Santa Barbara County, in California.

Taxonomy
At the time the species was divided into two subtaxa (subspecies or varieties): H. w. walkeriana and *H. w. morroensis 
The latter was thought to be extinct but was rediscovered.

In 2004, it was elevated to species status as Helminthoglypta morroensis and it inherited the endangered status it had when it was part of Helminthoglypta walkeriana.

Both snails together were known as the banded dune snail. Today H. walkeriana is the Morro shoulderband, and H. morroensis is the Chorro shoulderband.

Conservation
This snail was placed on the United States' Endangered Species List in 1994.

The USFWS recommends that the Morro shoulderband be downlisted to threatened status and the Chorro shoulderband be delisted.

The snails eat decaying plants and are eaten by birds, reptiles and mammals. Within the narrow distribution in coastal dune and scrub communities in Western San Luis Obispo County, they only come out in wet weather. They seal themselves inside of their shells for months at a time when it's dry for months at a time.

References

External links 
 FWS: Banded dune snail — Helminthoglypta walkeriana species profile

Helminthoglypta
Endemic fauna of California
Fauna of the California chaparral and woodlands
•
Natural history of San Luis Obispo County, California
Natural history of Santa Barbara County, California
Molluscs of the United States
Critically endangered fauna of California
Gastropods described in 1911
Taxonomy articles created by Polbot
ESA endangered species